Kevin A. McCarthy (born 1950) is a former Democratic member of the Illinois House of Representatives, representing the 37th District from 1997 to 2011. The district included all of Orland Hills, portions of Orland Park, Tinley Park, Oak Forest and unincorporated Frankfort Square.

In the 1996 general election, McCarthy, of Orland Park, defeated Republican incumbent John Doody to represent the 37th district. He resigned effective December 27, 2011. The Democratic Representative Committee of the 37th Representative District appointed Charles W. Krezwick to the vacancy.

References

External links

Illinois General Assembly - Representative Kevin A. McCarthy (D) 37th District official IL House website
Bills Committees
Project Vote Smart - Representative Kevin A. McCarthy (IL) profile
Follow the Money - Kevin A McCarthy
2006 2004 2002 2000 1998 1996 campaign contributions

1950 births
Living people
Democratic Party members of the Illinois House of Representatives
21st-century American politicians